AMV (All Music Video) was a music video show broadcast by the Seven Network between 2000 and 2002. It aired between 7.30am and 9am every weekday, following the 90 minute-long Sunrise news bulletin. It was cancelled in February 2002 when Sunrise expanded into a three-hour-long (later three-and-a-half-hour) format.

AMV was similar to the long-running ABC1 music show rage in that it featured no host, and Network Ten's Video Hits in that it aired a combination of new and popular clips. However, due to the early morning timeslot (which competed against children's programming such as Cheez TV), content was often censored; for example upon broadcasting the controversial video for Robbie Williams' "Rock DJ", the infamous gory ending was not shown.

See also

 List of Australian music television shows

2000 Australian television series debuts
2002 Australian television series endings
Australian music chart television shows
Australian music television series
Seven Network original programming